The Schaukelgraben is a stream in Saxony, Germany. It flows into the Pösgraben near Liebertwolkwitz.

See also 
List of rivers of Saxony

References 

Rivers of Saxony
Rivers of Germany